is a Japanese concept for the public use of deep underground, enabled by a 2001 law. It was first thought of in the late 1980s as Japan faced ever-increasing land values in the economic bubble, to allow the use of heretofore-unused deep underground for necessary water and utility ducts and other city tunnels.

However, due to technical difficulties in ventilation, emergency procedures and other safety-related issues and the relatively high cost, no projects using deep underground have been completed as of 2010.

Definition
 Depth greater than 40 meters or
 Depth 10 meters greater than the layer on which deep foundation rests
In the case of public use, no compensation to the land owner is required.

Projects using the law
 Underground water mains in Kobe (Chūō-ku, Kobe)
 Project approved on June 19, 2007 (first ever in Japan).
 Tokyo Gaikan Expressway (Tōmei Junction - Ōizumi Junction/Interchange)
 Project status elevated to construction stage on April 27, 2009.

Projects anticipated to use the law
 Capacity expansion of Chūō Main Line (extension of Keiyō Line from Tokyo Station to Mitaka Station)
 Extension of Tsukuba Express from Akihabara Station to Tokyo Station
 Chūō Shinkansen (a total of 100 km of deep underground track in Tokyo, Nagoya and Osaka areas)
 Hanshin Expressway Route 2 Yodogawa-Sagan Line third phase (extension from Toyosaki, Kita-ku, Osaka to Hiejima, Kadoma)

External links
 Law on Special Measures for the Public Use of Deep Underground (大深度地下の公共的使用に関する特別措置法 dai-shindo chika no kōkyō-teki shiyō ni kansuru tokubetsu sochihō or 大深度地下使用法 dai-shindo chika shiyōhō)
 Ministry of Land, Infrastructure, Transport and Tourism page on the utilization of deep underground
 Group plans to bury Tokyo's elevated 'shuto'

Civil engineering